The Gerald D. Hines Waterwall Park, formerly the Williams Waterwall and the Transco Waterwall, is a multi-story sculptural fountain that sits opposite the south face of Williams Tower in the Uptown District of Houston. The fountain and its surrounding park were built as an architectural amenity to the adjacent tower. Both the fountain and tower were designed by John Burgee Architects with Philip Johnson. Originally privately owned in common with the office tower, the waterwall and the surrounding land were purchased by the Uptown Houston Tax Increment Reinvestment Zone, a non-profit local government corporation, in 2008 to ensure the long term preservation of the waterwall and park. The fountain currently operates between 10 am and 9 pm.

Construction 
John Burgee Architects and Philip Johnson, in coordination with developer Gerald D. Hines began working on the Transco Tower complex in 1982, and completed construction of the office tower 18 months later in 1983. The Waterwall was fully and regularly operational in 1985.

Construction and maintenance cost figures were never released, but at the time of completion, Johnson and Hines made public vital statistics about the wall, including measurements and water volume.

Description 

The architects' design for the Waterwall was to be a "horseshoe of rushing water" opposite the Transco (now Williams) Tower. The concave portion of the circle, which faces north toward the tower, is fronted by a "proscenium arch" shorter than the fountain itself. The convex portion, its backside, faces south onto Hidalgo Street.

Water cascades in vast channeled sheets from the narrower top rim of the circle to the wider base below, both on the concave side and on the convex side. This creates a visually striking urban waterfall that can be viewed from various buildings around the district.

 of water cover the interior, while  cover the exterior. The main building material of the fountain is St. Joe brick. However, the Romanesque arches are made of Indiana Buss limestone, while the wall's base is black granite. The entire fountain's water supply, consisting of 78,500 gallons is recycled by an internal mechanism every three hours and two minutes.

Waterwall lore 

Known simply as "The Waterwall" to locals, the fountain is a popular backdrop for tourists and locals alike. The Waterwall is considered a central part of the Houston landscape and is often host to picnics and concerts.

On the night of September 23, 1987, former Oiler quarterback Dan Pastorini married Dena Kindred at a private ceremony at the wall.

The wall was an "official sight" during the 1992 Republican National Convention.

In 2001, the made-for-TV movie The Way She Moves was filmed in Houston and contained scenes shot in front of the Waterwall.

The Bollywood song Dilbar Dilbar from the film Sirf Tum was shot here.

In 2013, the made-for-TV movie The Preacher's Mistress was filmed in Houston and contained a scene shot in front of the Waterwall.

The 1992 Chuck Norris film Sidekicks had a portion filmed at the Waterwall.

In 2012, an original site-specific performance, "Natural Acts in Artificial Water" by director/choreographer Stephan Koplowitz was performed on May 19, 20, 2012.https://www.skoplowitz.com/naturalacts

Renaming
Originally the "Transco Waterwall", the waterwall was renamed the "Williams Waterfall" to correspond with the renaming of the adjacent office tower due to the merger of Transco Energy Co. with the Williams Companies. The City of Houston renamed the site again on December 17, 2009 honoring Gerald D. Hines for his impact on Houston architecture during the last six decades.

Notes

External links

 Hines Properties – Williams Tower

Buildings and structures in Houston
Fountains in Texas
Tourist attractions in Houston